Nicu Stroia (born 20 October 1971) is a Romanian gymnast. He competed at the 1992 Summer Olympics and the 1996 Summer Olympics.

References

1971 births
Living people
Romanian male artistic gymnasts
Olympic gymnasts of Romania
Gymnasts at the 1992 Summer Olympics
Gymnasts at the 1996 Summer Olympics
People from Neamț County